Győző Kulcsár (18 October 1940 – 19 September 2018) was a Hungarian fencer. He competed in the individual and team épée events at the 1964, 1968, 1972 and 1976 Olympics and won four gold (one individual and three team) and two individual bronze medals. He also won three world titles with the Hungarian team, in 1970, 1971 and 1978.

After retiring from competitions Kulcsár worked as a fencing coach, in Hungary (c. 1980–1988 and after 2001) and Italy (c. 1988–2000). His trainees include Tímea Nagy, Emese Szász and his nephew Krisztián Kulcsár.

He died on 19 September 2018 at the age of 77.

References

External links 
 
 

1940 births
2018 deaths
Hungarian male épée fencers
Olympic fencers of Hungary
Fencers at the 1964 Summer Olympics
Fencers at the 1968 Summer Olympics
Fencers at the 1972 Summer Olympics
Fencers at the 1976 Summer Olympics
Olympic gold medalists for Hungary
Olympic bronze medalists for Hungary
Olympic medalists in fencing
Martial artists from Budapest
Medalists at the 1964 Summer Olympics
Medalists at the 1968 Summer Olympics
Medalists at the 1972 Summer Olympics
Medalists at the 1976 Summer Olympics
20th-century Hungarian people
21st-century Hungarian people